Tararam is a creative  multidisciplinary rhythm ensemble  that incorporates drumming, dance, music and theater in its shows. The performing artists use various percussion instruments such as drums, barrels and various household items such as brooms, spoons and tin cans.

Since the group’s premiere performance in 1997 at the Israel Festival of stage arts, Tararam has pursued an International touring schedule  including Expo 2000 in Germany, the 2004 Summer Olympics in Athens, Kulturefest in New York, Maccabiah Games, as well as prominent events in Israel including The Yom Haatzmaut Torch-lighting Ceremony, Israel Prize Award Ceremony and many more.

History 
Tararam's artistic director and founder is drummer and director Doron Raphaeli. Raphaeli studied at the Jerusalem Music Academy and served in the Israeli Defence Forces as a drummer in the Military Band. In 1987, Raphaeli continued his studies in New York City at "The Drummers Collective" and the "La Fareta" African Music Centre.

In the fall of 1997 Raphaeli was contracted to compose an alternative outdoor performance for The Israeli Performing Arts Festival in Jerusalem. He gathered talented drummers, percussionists, dancers and singers, and created an innovative project called “Tararam”, which is the Hebrew translation for “hubbub or commotion”.  

Influenced by the rhythmical genre that the UK band “Stomp” had introduced, Raphaeli added a new dimension to his creative ensemble by combining live musicians on stage with tightly choreographed movement sequences in addition to drumming on nontraditional objects, industrial tools, percussion and an old jalopy.

The Tararam group performs year-round at various events ranging from  mega sized venues in front of mass crowds, to small private  events, corporate events and theater shows. The group has  performed in numerous countries including Costa Rica, South Africa,  Germany, United States, Finland, India, South Korea, Canada, Turkey, Greece and more.  

Over the years, Tararam has been selected to perform at various key events for prominent people, such as the 2004 Olympics in Athens as well Shimon Peres’ 80th  birthday party in front of world leaders such as Bill Clinton.

In 2017, Taram was the opening act of the TedX event held in Tel-Aviv alongside Israeli artist Rita. In 2018, the group performed in Germany, as part of the celebrations for Israel's 70th birthday.

In 2022, Tararam performed as part of the 2022 Maccabiah Games. They were also chosen to perform at the opening ceremony of the new Blood Bank inaugurated in Ramla that was donated by billionaire Bernie Marcus.

Raphaeli's daughter, Eden, is a dancer in Tararam and part of the production team.

Tararam Kids 
Raphaeli first had the idea to create a series of Musical Performances created specially  for kids in 2004. The first musical  was released that year and was called "Tararam Kids in the Surprise Yard" that focused on equality and acceptance. 

The second musical, 3 years later, was called "Tararam Kids - Saving the World", and focused on increasing awareness for environmentalism and conservation to children. The third musical, released in 2011 was called "Tararam Kids - Power of Wishes", which was about a group of kids getting their wish to live in an adult-free world.

The fourth show, released in 2021, is called What a Wonderful World, also centers on environmental awareness.

Past Notable Members 
Over the years some leading drummers and singers were part of the band including: Din Din Aviv, Itay Polishuk, Yotam Elazari from the band Full Trunk, and more, Yair Tzabary.

Musical Partnerships 
Over the years, the band had collaborated with many artists, among them: Omer Adam, Sarit Hadad, Idan Reichel, Orit Wolf,  Y Circus, Tomer Meisner, DJ Asi C, and the Turkish mega star  Gülben Ergen.

In May 2022 the band released a new single with the singer Eden Rafeali, “I Smile”, a cover to a Kirk Franklin song.

Commercial Partnerships 
Since its launch the band performed in various business, promotional and corporate events for some of Israel’s leading companies including Microsoft, Carlsberg, Tnuva, Egged, Sonol, SunDisk, Coca-Cola, KLA, Cellebrite and many more. It has also participated in several ad campaigns for different companies such as Super-Pharm, Cellcom, and Alonit.

References

External links

Tararam's YouTube Page
Tararam's Facebook Page
Tararam's Instagram Page

Israeli ethnic musical groups